Picture Perfect is the second studio album by American pop punk band Every Avenue.

Background
On April 15, 2009, it was announced that drummer Michael Govaere had left the band to work on his own studio, Downbeat.

Release
Between late June and late August, the band performed on the Warped Tour. The first single from Picture Perfect, "Tell Me I'm a Wreck", was uploaded to the Every Avenue MySpace page on October 9. It was also made available to download on the iTunes Store and for free listening on Spotify. Picture Perfect was released through Fearless Records on November 3, 2009. In January 2010, the group went on a co-headlining US tour with Sparks the Rescue. They were supported by the Audition and the Summer Set. Followoing this, the band appeared at the Extreme Thing festival. The music video for Tell Me I'm a Wreck was released online on August 12. Newest single release, Mindset video premiered on the 17th March 2011.

Track listing
All songs written and composed by David Strauchman and Jimmie Deeghan.

Personnel
David Ryan Strauchman - lead vocals, piano
Joshua Randall Withenshaw - lead guitar
Jimmie Deeghan - rhythm guitar, vocals
Matthew Black - bass guitar, vocals 
Dennis Wilson - drums, percussion

Production
Mitch Allan, Mike Green, Zack Odom, Kenneth Mount - producer, mixing, mastering

References

External links

Picture Perfect at YouTube (streamed copy where licensed)

2009 albums
Every Avenue albums
Fearless Records albums